Malek Koussa (born 16 August 1971) is a former Syrian footballer who played for Syria national football team.

External links

zerozero.pt

1971 births
Syrian footballers
Living people
Syria international footballers
Place of birth missing (living people)
Association football goalkeepers
Syrian Premier League players